Amal Omari McCaskill (born October 28, 1973) is an American former professional basketball player, at the center position.

After a four-year career at Marquette University, McCaskill was selected by the National Basketball Association's Orlando Magic with the 49th pick (2nd round) of the 1996 NBA Draft. He appeared in 4 seasons with as many teams: 1996-97 with Orlando, 2001-02 with the San Antonio Spurs, 2002-03 with the Atlanta Hawks and 2003-04 with the Philadelphia 76ers.

After his release from Orlando in 1997 (and Philadelphia in 2004), McCaskill played as an import in Greece, Spain, Venezuela, Puerto Rico, Italy and Lebanon. In the United States, McCaskill also appeared for the CBA's Fort Wayne Fury in 1997-98, and the Albany Patroons (2007–08).

In June 2008, McCaskill moved to the Philippine Basketball Association, as an import for the Magnolia Beverage Masters, helping the team reach the semi-finals.

References

External links
NBA.com profile

Eurobasket.com profile
ACB.com profile

1973 births
Living people
African-American basketball players
Albany Patroons players
American expatriate basketball people in Bosnia and Herzegovina
American expatriate basketball people in China
American expatriate basketball people in Finland
American expatriate basketball people in Greece
American expatriate basketball people in Italy
American expatriate basketball people in Lebanon
American expatriate basketball people in the Philippines
American expatriate basketball people in South Korea
American expatriate basketball people in Spain
American expatriate basketball people in Venezuela
American men's basketball players
Atlanta Hawks players
Baloncesto León players
Basketball players from Illinois
CB Lucentum Alicante players
CB Valladolid players
Centers (basketball)
FC Barcelona Bàsquet players
Fort Wayne Fury players
Fortitudo Pallacanestro Bologna players
Gaiteros del Zulia players
Goyang Carrot Jumpers players
Greek Basket League players
Guaiqueríes de Margarita players
Daegu KOGAS Pegasus players
KK Igokea players
KTP-Basket players
Liga ACB players
Marquette Golden Eagles men's basketball players
Orlando Magic draft picks
Orlando Magic players
Panionios B.C. players
Philadelphia 76ers players
Philippine Basketball Association imports
Power forwards (basketball)
Qingdao Eagles players
San Antonio Spurs players
San Miguel Beermen players
Seoul SK Knights players
Sportspeople from Maywood, Illinois
Ulsan Hyundai Mobis Phoebus players
Sagesse SC basketball players
21st-century African-American sportspeople
20th-century African-American sportspeople